Sir Ghillean Tolmie Prance  (born 13 July 1937) is a prominent British botanist and ecologist who has published extensively on the taxonomy of families such as Chrysobalanaceae and Lecythidaceae, but drew particular attention in documenting the pollination ecology of Victoria amazonica. Prance is a former Director of the Royal Botanic Gardens, Kew.

Early life
Prance was born on 13 July 1937 in Brandeston, Suffolk, England. He was educated at Malvern College and Keble College, Oxford. In 1957, he achieved BSc Biology. In 1963 he received a D. Phil. in Forest Botany from the Commonwealth Forestry Institute, Oxford.

Career
Prance worked from 1963 at The New York Botanical Garden, initially as a research assistant and, on his departure in 1988, as Director of the Institute of Economic Botany and Senior Vice-President for Science. Much of his career at the New York Botanical Garden was spent conducting extensive fieldwork in the Amazon region of Brazil. In 1973 he coordinated the first Botany Postgraduate Degree held in the Amazon, at National Institute of Amazonian Research, in Manaus. He was Director of the Royal Botanic Gardens, Kew from 1988 to 1999.

Later work
He has remained very active in his retirement, notably involving himself with the Eden Project. Prance, a devout Christian, was  the chair of A Rocha and was president of Christians in Science 2002–08.

He is actively involved on environmental issues, a trustee of the Amazon Charitable Trust, and a Vice-President of the Nature in Art Trust. He has been president of the UK Wild Flower Society for several years.

Honours
Prance was knighted in 1995. He has been a Fellow of the Linnean Society since 1961, and served as its president in the years 1997–2000. He was made a Fellow of the Royal Society in 1993, and was awarded the Victoria Medal of Honour in 1999.
He was awarded the Patron's Medal of the Royal Geographical Society in 1994.

In 2000 he was made a Commander of the Order of the Southern Cross by the President of Brazil. In 2012 he was awarded the Order of the Rising Sun, Gold Rays and Neck Ribbon by the Government of Japan.

Legacy
Two photographic portraits of Prance are held at the National Portrait Gallery, London.

In 1984, botanist Dieter Carl Wasshausen published Pranceacanthus, a genus of flowering plants from Brazil and Bolivia belonging to the family Acanthaceae and named after Prance. 

A biography of Prance was written by Clive Langmead in 2001.

Video
 A Passion for Plants (DVD), Christian Television Association (of the UK)

References

External links
 The Prance Family
Curriculum vitae
Honours list
A 1998 interview with Science Watch correspondent Peter Moore
2005 interview, Christians in Science, 16 July 2011
 1993 International Cosmos Prize

1937 births
Living people
20th-century British botanists
21st-century British botanists
Alumni of Keble College, Oxford
Botanists active in Kew Gardens
British Christians
British ecologists
English botanists
Fellows of Keble College, Oxford
Fellows of the Royal Society
Fellows of the Royal Society of Biology
Knights Bachelor
People educated at Malvern College
People from Suffolk Coastal (district)
Place of birth missing (living people)
Presidents of the Linnean Society of London
Recipients of the Great Cross of the National Order of Scientific Merit (Brazil)
Victoria Medal of Honour recipients
Members of the Royal Swedish Academy of Sciences